The Slovenian National Defense Corps ( (abbreviated as SNVZ)) was an anti-Slovene Partisans military organization that was active in the territory of the Operation Zone of the Adriatic Littoral in the German-occupied portion of Italy. Although led by Anton Kokalj, it was directly subordinated to German Nazi commander Odilo Globočnik. The organization was ideologically and organizationally linked to the Slovene Home Guard that was active in Province of Ljubljana.

Background
The organization had problems recruiting from the Slovene minority in Italy (1920–1947) that has had experienced Fascist Italianization already for almost two decades. So most of its officers instead came from Province of Ljubljana. At their peak, the organization had only about 2000 members.

Activity
They provided Germans with lists of locations of Liberation Front of the Slovene Nation hideouts and suspicious individuals (described as "propagandist", "husband is a Communist").

At the time Boris Pahor, now an internationally best known Slovene writer from Trieste and concentration camp survivor, has been handed over and sent to the camps in Germany, another 600 persons were also handed over to the Germans by them.

References

Military of Slovenia
Slovenian collaborators with Nazi Germany
Slovenia in World War II